This is a list of named passenger trains in Switzerland.

References

 Swiss Railway time table (current)
 CityNightLine

Switzerland
 
Named passenger trains